This is a list of abbots of Monkwearmouth–Jarrow Abbey.  Wearmouth–Jarrow is a twin-foundation English monastery, located on the River Wear in Sunderland and the River Tyne at Jarrow respectively, in the Kingdom of Northumbria.

Abbots
Whilst they were independent monasteries, they each had an abbot.

Abbey removed to Durham, 1083

As a cell of Durham
During this time, the two monasteries each had a master.

External links
Saxon Houses: including Wearmouth and Jarrow, A History of the County of Durham: Volume 2 (1907), pp. 79-85

Monkwearmouth
 
Lists of English people